Theatrhythm Final Fantasy: Curtain Call is a rhythm video game. A sequel to the 2012 video game Theatrhythm Final Fantasy and the second title in the rhythm series, it features similar gameplay to its predecessor. It was released for the Nintendo 3DS on April 24, 2014 in Japan, on September 16, 2014 in North America, on September 18, 2014 in Australia, and in Europe on September 19, 2014.

Gameplay

As with Theatrhythm Final Fantasy, Curtain Call is a rhythm video game. Players use characters from across the Final Fantasy series to navigate through songs in rhythm games. Players go through the various stages and modes collecting Rhythm Points: the better the player performs, the more Rhythm Points the player gains at the end of the stage. The game is split up into three different gameplay modes: Field Stages, where the player controls one character, Battle songs, where teams of characters face off against enemies and bosses, and Event Stages, which features songs played against a full-motion video background of the game or film the music is drawn from. A new Versus mode is included where two players face off against each other in multiplayer using the game song.

Curtain Call includes 221 songs not counting downloadable content (DLC) taken from various entries in the series. Along with the songs and DLC content created for the original and fresh songs from titles featured in the original, the game features new songs from Final Fantasy XIV: A Realm Reborn, Final Fantasy X-2, Final Fantasy XIIIs two sequels XIII-2 and Lightning Returns, Final Fantasy Type-0, the movie Final Fantasy VII: Advent Children and other spin-off games in the franchise such as Final Fantasy Adventure, and the Crystal Chronicles and Dissidia games. There are 60 playable characters available to the player, not including DLC.

Field Stages are linked to the characters the stages are drawn from: if the player is going through an airship level to music from Final Fantasy V, it will use the airship from the game. After finishing a level, the player and character(s) earn crystals, and the player is presented with a selection of new characters to pick from. During battle sequences, players can perform a Critical Hit Trigger on an enemy after hitting specific notes. In Versus mode, a special EX Burst gauge fills up, and when full allows nine different EX Burst Skills, which are used to put the other player at a disadvantage. A new mode, called Medley Quests, was added, where the player completes quests, defeats bosses and gains new characters. The Museum feature returns, where players can review their scores and loot. During Field Stages, a Fat Chocobo will appear at random, granting the player various pieces of loot. For battle mode, players assemble four-character teams. Spells for healing and such are used automatically when the player strikes specific notes. A new "Daily Feature" is available, where a new song is presented to the player each day, and upon successful completion the player receives 1.5x the normal number of Rhythm Points.

Development
The first sign of Curtain Calls existence came in September 2013, when the trademark was registered for North America. The title was announced nearly two weeks later in Shonen Jump magazine. According to producer Ichiro Hazama, it is to be the last Theatrhythm, though it will serve as the base for future additions to the game such as DLC and other content in the future. An English demo was released on the Nintendo eShop on September 4, 2014, which will unlock characters in the full game if downloaded.

Reception

Theatrhythm Final Fantasy: Curtain Call received a positive reception in Japan. The game scored 35/40 from Famitsu, with the four reviewers giving scores of 9, 9, 9 and 8. In its first week on sale in Japan, the game sold 80,523 copies, going through 55.72% of its shipment. Square Enix deliberately shipped a large quantity of the game because sales of the previous Theatrhythm were so strong that there were supply problems.

Elsewhere, the game received "favorable" reviews according to the review aggregation website Metacritic.  Digital Spy gave it a score of four stars out of five and stated that "As a tribute to a franchise's greatest moments, it's almost unparalleled in its breadth and attention to detail, and whether you're a long-time fan or someone who has only skimmed through a few core entries, there's no better way to revisit the series."  Slant Magazine also gave it a similar score of four stars out of five and said, "While there may not be anything new in Curtain Call, there sure is a lot of it. And if you think their games have grown stale, here's proof that at least their music hasn't."  However, Shacknews gave it a score of seven out of ten and said, "It's too bad that now that the company has shown how well it can work, it's taking a bow." GamesRadar ranked the game as the number fifteen best Nintendo 3DS game to own, praising the number of songs, as well as the cutscenes and in-game collectible cards.

Notes

References

External links

2014 video games
Final Fantasy video games
Music video games
Nintendo 3DS games
Nintendo 3DS eShop games
Nintendo 3DS-only games
Nintendo Network games
Music in fiction
Video game sequels
Multiplayer and single-player video games
Video games developed in Japan
Indieszero games